DIAP may refer to:

Defense-wide Information Assurance Program, a group in the US Department of Defense
, a German diploma of secondary education
The ICAO designation of Port Bouet Airport in the Côte d'Ivoire
Dredging International Asia Pacific, a Singaporean dredging company